Dr. Champ is a 2010 South Korean television series about a doctor caught in a love triangle between a judo athlete and a crippled doctor who was once a speed-skating star.

Cast
 Kim So-yeon as Kim Yeon Woo
 Uhm Tae-woong as Lee Do Wook
 Jung Gyu-woon as Park Ji Heon
 Cha Ye-ryun as Kang Hee Young
 Ma Dong-seok as Oh Jung Dae
 Jung Suk-won as Yoo Sang Bong
 Kim Hyung-bum as Choi Ham Shik
 Yum Dong-hyun as Jung Ho Chang
 Lee Si-eon as Heo Taek Woo
 Shin Dong-hee as Kang Woo Ram
 Jung Ui-kap as Choi Dae Sub
 Moon Hee-kyung as Go Mi Ja (Yeon Woo's mother)
 Heo Joon-suk as Kim Kyung Woo (Yeon Woo's older brother)
 Yoon Bong-gil as Uhm Dong Ho
 Im Sung Kyu as Go Bum
 Kim Ga-eun as Pi Jung Ah
 Kang So-ra as Kwon Yoo Ri
 Seo Hyun-suk as Chae Eun Suk
 Go Jun as Chang Soo
 Kang Ki-hwa as Go Eun Mi
 Jo Min-ki as Professor Seo (cameo)
 Han Bo-bae as Jo Min Ji (cameo, ep1)
 Nam Hyun-hee (남현희) as fencing athlete (cameo)
 Yoo Sang-chul (유상철) as youth soccer coach (cameo)
 Kim Byung-man as Im Ki Man (cameo)
 Min Hyo-rin as nurse (cameo, ep16)
 Onew as doctor (cameo, ep16)
 Song Ji-eun

References

External links
 Dr. Champ official SBS website 
 

2010 South Korean television series debuts
2010 South Korean television series endings
Seoul Broadcasting System television dramas
Korean-language television shows
South Korean romance television series
South Korean sports television series